This is a list of museums in Cambodia.

Museums in Cambodia 
Angkor Borei Museum
Angkor Ceramic Museum at Tani
Angkor National Museum
Angkor Panorama Museum
Battambang Provincial Museum
Cambodian Cultural Village
Cambodian Landmine Museum
Choeung Ek
Kampong Thom Museum
MGC Asian Traditional Textiles Museum
National Museum of Cambodia
Preah Norodom Sihanouk-Angkor Museum
Silver Pagoda
Tuol Sleng Genocide Museum
War Museum Cambodia

See also 

 List of museums
 List of archives in Cambodia
 List of libraries in Cambodia

External links 	

 
Museums
Cambodia
Museums
Cambodia